Frondaria caulescens is a species of orchid and the sole species of the genus Frondaria. The species is found at high altitudes from central Colombia, Ecuador, Peru and Bolivia. It is unique because of its leaflike sheaths of the ramicauls.

It is nearly impossible to maintain this species in cultivation.

References 

  (1986) Monographs in Systematic Botany from the Missouri Botanical Garden 15: 29.
  (2006) Epidendroideae (Part One). Genera Orchidacearum 4: 359 ff. Oxford University Press.

External links 

Pleurothallidinae
Orchids of South America
Pleurothallidinae genera
Monotypic Epidendroideae genera